Yum Yum may refer to:

Entertainment
 Yum Yum (album), released in 2004 by Boy George's electronica project, "The Twin"
 Yum Yum, the heroine in The Mikado operetta by Gilbert and Sullivan
 Princess Yum-Yum, the heroine in The Thief and the Cobbler film
 Yum-Yum, the female cat in the fictional Cat Who series by Lilian Jackson Braun

Food
 Yum-Yum Donuts, a chain of donut shops based in California
 Yum Yum, a glazed hand-twisted rope-shaped doughnut
 Yum Yum, a brand of instant noodles

Places
 Yum Yum, Tennessee, United States

See also
 "Yum Yum Yum", a 2014 single by Lip Service
 Yum (disambiguation)
 Blueberry Yum Yum (disambiguation)
 Yummy (disambiguation)